The word cryptex is a neologism coined by the author Dan Brown for his 2003 novel The Da Vinci Code, denoting a portable vault used to hide secret messages. It is a word formed from Greek  kryptós, "hidden, secret" and Latin codex; "an apt title for this device" since it uses "the science of cryptology to protect information written on the contained scroll or codex" (p. 199 of the novel). The first physical cryptex was created by Justin Kirk Nevins in 2004.

Design and function 

The (first) cryptex featured in the novel The Da Vinci Code is described as a stone cylinder comprising "five doughnut-sized disks of marble [that] had been stacked and affixed to one another within a delicate brass framework"; end caps make it impossible to see inside the hollow cylinder. Each of the disks is carved with the entire alphabet and can be rotated independently of the others to create different letter-alignment combinations, including but not limited to words, initialisms, and anagrams.  Although it is not clear whether the alphabet in question preserves the U/V and/or I/J distinctions and/or includes the letter W, when only the alignment of the disks with respect to each other is considered, the number of potential combinations is between 234 (279,841) and 264 (456,976); if the mechanism treats combinations having the same disk alignment but different degrees of rotation around the cylinder's long axis as distinct, as does a multiple-wheel combination lock or slot machine employing an indicator bar along which the specified numbers are to be aligned, this number rises to between 235 (6,436,343) and 265 (11,881,376).

The cryptex works "much like a bicycle's combination lock", and if one arranges the disks to spell out the correct password, "the tumblers inside align, and the entire cylinder slides apart" (p. 200).  In the inner compartment of the cryptex, secret information can be hidden, written on a scroll of thin papyrus wrapped around a fragile vial of vinegar as a security measure: if one does not know the password but tries to force the cryptex open, the vial will break and the vinegar will dissolve the papyrus before it can be read.

In popular culture
 In Season 4, episode 14 of the TV series Parks and Recreation, Ron helps Ben open a cryptex that Leslie has given him in an elaborate Valentine's Day scavenger hunt.
 In "The Brothers Grimoire", a second-season episode of the American TV series Witches of East End, Dash and Killian inherit a cryptex from their mother.
 On the NBC American reality series Treasure Hunters, nested cryptex were among the puzzles that challenged contestants, and were used in the finale.
 In "Phased and Confused", a season 3 episode of the American TV series Eureka, a nearly-unbreakable cryptex is the key to a hidden underground bunker.
 In episode 88 of the South Korean variety show Running Man, the cast members must find clues attached to other staff members to open their cryptex.
 In "Down the Rabbit Hole", a fourth season episode of the American TV series The Vampire Diaries, depicts a sword with a cryptex under its hilt.
 In "The Blame Game", a Season 8 episode of the American TV series Castle, one of the puzzles the characters need to solve involves a cryptex.
In "Valley of the Wolves", the head of the mafia has a cryptex to store his diary narrating his actions and political connections.
The Wii version of Tomb Raider: Anniversary features cryptex puzzles that Lara Croft must solve to activate certain mechanisms.  The solution to each cryptex puzzle can be found in its vicinity, which Lara takes a rubbing of, and the player is given a limited number of disk rotations to reproduce the solution before the cryptex resets.  In more difficult puzzles, rotating one disk will cause one or more disks to rotate simultaneously.
The 2009 first-person shooter The Conduit features hidden "pyramid lock" puzzles that function like cryptexes, which can be solved to open secret weapon caches.  They resemble the Eye of Providence with three incomplete concentric rings directly above it that must be rotated such that none of them overlap with the symbol's pyramid.  In more difficult pyramid lock puzzles, rotating one ring in a certain direction may cause one or two other rings to rotate simultaneously.
In series 9, episode 6 of the British comedy panel game show Taskmaster, comedian Rose Matafeo presents a cryptex as her offering for the prize category "The Thing That, If You Found It In a Field, You'd Be Most Pleased About".

Trademark in the United States
In the United States "Cryptex" is a registered trademark of Justin Kirk Nevins.

See also 
 Combination lock
 Wordlock, a combination lock using letters instead of numerals
 Jefferson disk, a cipher-encoding device mechanically similar to a cryptex

References

General references
 Brown, Dan (2003). The Da Vinci Code, Doubleday.
 Da Vinci Declassified, 2006 TLC video documentary, written, directed and produced by David Carr, David Comtois, and Frankie Glass. Narrated by Jeff Fischer.

Inline citations

External links 
 Cryptex Security Boxes
Cryptex USB Drive (long)/
Cryptex USB Drive (compass), round

Cryptographic hardware
Fictional technology
Da Vinci Code